Jahula was a Palestinian Arab village in the Safad Subdistrict. It was depopulated during the 1947–1948 civil war in Mandatory Palestine on May 1, 1948, by the Palmach's First Battalion of Operation Yiftach. It was located 11 km northeast of Safad.

In 1945, the village had a population of 420. The village had one mosque and a shrine for a local sage known as al-Shaykh Salih.

Location
Jahula was situated near the Tiberias— Al-Mutilla highway, in the foothills.

History
The Jahula area had been occupied from the seventh through the third millennium B.C., according to archaeological excavations conducted in 1986.   Pottery remains from the Roman and Byzantine periods have been found in the area.

Ottoman era
Jahula was recorded  in the Ottoman census of 1596 as belonging to the nahiya (subdistrict) of Jira, part of  Safad Sanjak, and at the time it had 5 Muslim households; an estimated population of 28 inhabitants. They paid a fixed tax rate of 20%  on crops such as wheat and barley, and reared goats, bees, and water buffalos. Total revenue was 1,550  akçe.

In 1838, it was noted as a village in the Safad district, while in 1875 Victor Guérin report passing through the village (which he called Kharbet Djaouleh),  finding only a few of the houses inhabited.

In 1881, the PEF's Survey of Western Palestine found at Ain Jahula "a large perennial spring, with a stream flowing to the march of the Huleh; a large supply of good water".

The villagers of Jahula were predominantly Muslim. Their mosque, about 1 km north of the village, was the location of a shrine to Shaykh Salih.

Most villagers were engaged in agriculture, and a spring on the north side of the village supplied water.  Some villagers worked in quarries north of the village.

British Mandate era

In the 1922 census of Palestine, conducted by the British Mandate authorities,  Jahula had a population of 214; all Muslims, increasing in the  1931 census to 357;  still all Muslims,  in  a total of 90  houses.

In the 1945 statistics  Jahula had a population of 420 Muslims,  with 3,869 dunums of land, according to an official land and population survey.  1,626 dunums   were  allocated to grain farming, while 64 dunams were classified as urban land.

1948, and aftermath

Jahula was depopulated during the 1947–1948 civil war in Mandatory Palestine on May 1, 1948, by the Palmach's First Battalion of Operation Yiftach. Benny Morris writes that the cause of depopulation is unknown, while the American Historian Rosemarie Esber gives as depopulation cause: "Direct mortar attacks on civilians, siege, shooting at fleeing Arabs".

  
Of the village site the Palestinian historian Walid Khalidi wrote in 1992: "The only remains of the destroyed village are a few stone terraces. The site is enclosed by barbed wire, and cactuses and trees grow on it. The village spring is still in use by Israelis. Parts of the village land are planted in cotton and watermelons, while other parts are wooded and hilly."

References

Bibliography

External links
Welcome To Jahula
Jahula, Zochrot
Jahula, Villages of Palestine
Survey of Western Palestine, Map 4: IAA, Wikimedia commons
Jahula from the Khalil Sakakini Cultural Center

Arab villages depopulated during the 1948 Arab–Israeli War
District of Safad